Ecora Resources PLC is a royalty and streaming company providing capital to the mining sector. It activities are primarily in Australia, North and South America, and Europe. It is listed on the London and Toronto Stock Exchanges.

History 
The company was founded as "Diversified Bank Shares Limited" in 1967. It was first listed on the Unlisted Securities Market in 1984 and started to acquire Australian oil, gas and mining assets in 1989. It was first listed on the London Stock Exchange in 1996. It completed its exit from the thermal coal market with the sale of its royalty income from a mine in Narrabri in Australia in December 2021. It adopted the name Anglo Pacific Group PLC in 1997. It became Ecora Resources PLC in October 2022.

References

External links 
 Official site

Companies listed on the Toronto Stock Exchange
British companies established in 1967
Mining companies of the United Kingdom
Companies listed on the London Stock Exchange
Companies based in the City of Westminster
1967 establishments in England